Duke Xuan may refer to the following rulers during the Zhou dynasty:

Duke Xuan of Wey (died 700 BC)
Duke Xuan of Qin (died 664 BC)
Duke Xuan of Chen (died 648 BC)
Duke Xuan of Qi (died 405 BC)

See also
Marquis Xuan of Cai (died 715 BC)